Cletus punctiger, the rice stinkbug, is a species of true bug in the family Coreidae. It is a pest of sorghum and other grass species in India.

References

Coreidae
Insect pests of millets